Andrew J. Toti (24 July 1915 – 20 March 2005) was a world-renowned American inventor. Toti was born in Visalia, California, and died in Modesto, California. He held more than 500 U.S. patents at the time of his death. Toti was honored by the Edison Society in 1995.

Among his many inventions, the most famous was an automated chicken plucker, a light-weight construction beam (commonly used in Australia), and the EndoFlex endotracheal tube (co-invented with Michael H. Wong]] and Jay Kotin). Toti invented a combination lock when he was 12 years old. Although he falsely claimed to have invented the "Mae West" life preserver, credited with saving hundreds of aviators' lives during World War II, it was actually invented by Peter Markus, who was granted a patent for it in 1928, when Toti was only 11 years old.

Toti attended Modesto High School through tenth grade. He completed his education through correspondence courses.

Toti owned and operated Tro-Pic-Kal Manufacturing Company of Modesto for approximately 60 years.

Perpetual motion
Toti worked at a pet project, building a perpetual motion machine. The physical laws of thermodynamics mean such a machine is impossible: if it were possible, it would offer a limitless energy supply.

Toti's machine was both mechanical and electromagnetic. He said he had reached 95% to 97% levels, meaning a power conversion loss of 5% to 3%. He believed his 3% energy loss is the lowest anyone has achieved.

"I still believe it's possible," he said.

Family
 Spouse: Marion Toti
 Daughter: Andrea Pimental née Toti
 Son: Tom Toti
 Unknown child
 Stepson: Raymond Webster

Toti's parents, who immigrated to the US from Italy, bought a delicatessen when he was nine years old.

External links
 EndoFlex
 US Patent Office
 photo
 NPR Audio Report

1915 births
2005 deaths
American people of Italian descent
20th-century American inventors